Mont Malartic is the second-highest point on the Mauritian island of Rodrigues, with a height of .

See also

References

Mont Malartic
mountains of Mauritius
mountains of Rodrigues